Gültepe is a neighbourhood of Kağıthane district in Istanbul with a 2007 population of 93,972.

Gallery

References 
 Kağıthane Municipality Guide 2008
 Kağıthane Municipality City Guide

Neighbourhoods of Kağıthane